Heterocampa averna is a species of prominent moth in the family Notodontidae. It was described by William Barnes and James Halliday McDunnough in 1910 and is found in North America.

The MONA or Hodges number for Heterocampa averna is 7991.

References

 Lafontaine, J. Donald & Schmidt, B. Christian (2010). "Annotated check list of the Noctuoidea (Insecta, Lepidoptera) of North America north of Mexico". ZooKeys, vol. 40, 1-239.

Further reading

 Arnett, Ross H. (2000). American Insects: A Handbook of the Insects of America North of Mexico. CRC Press.

External links

 Butterflies and Moths of North America
 NCBI Taxonomy Browser, Heterocampa averna

Notodontidae